RedfestDXB is a music festival organized by Done Events that began in 2013 and takes place annually at the Dubai Media City Amphitheatre.

Line ups 
This list contains the line ups for all the artists that have performed in the music festival till date.

RedfestDXB 2014

February 13, 2014 
 Jessie J
 Tinie Tempah
 Conor Maynard
 Marvin Humes

February 14, 2014 
 The Lumineers
 John Newman
 Rita Ora
 Naughty Boy
 A-Yo
 Mark Ronson
 Zane Lowe

RedfestDXB 2015 
 The Script
 Iggy Azalea
 Kid Ink
 Bastille
 Kiesza
 Jeremih
 Tinashe
 Ella Eyre
 G.R.L.
 Cris Cab
 Rixton
Closing set DJs
 Gordon City DJ
 Wilkinson

RedfestDXB 2016

February 11, 2016 
 Steve Aoki
 Rita Ora
 Dawin
 Nathalie Saba
 The Vamps
 Grace

February 12, 2016 
 Fifth Harmony
 Adam Lambert
 Redfoo
 Trey Songz
 MistaJam
 Eva Simons

RedfestDXB 2017

February 2, 2017 
 G-Eazy
 Sean Paul
 Daya
 The Veronicas
 Dany Neville - Closing DJ Set

February 3, 2017 
 Demi Lovato
 Tove Lo
 Mike Posner
 Calum Zibala
 Dany Neville - Closing DJ Set

RedfestDXB 2018

February 8, 2018 
 Anthony Touma
 Kelli-Leigh
 Russ
 The Chainsmokers

February 9, 2018 
 Bebe Rexha
 Craig David
 Kesha
 Marshmello

RedfestDXB 2019

February 14, 2019 
 DJ Snake
 G-Eazy
 Jonas Blue
 Jess Glynne

February 15, 2019 
 Camila Cabello
 Macklemore
 Jax Jones

References 

Events in Dubai
Annual events in the United Arab Emirates
Music festivals in the United Arab Emirates
Music festivals established in 2014
Winter events in the United Arab Emirates